The 1908–09 WPHL season was the ninth and final season of operation for the Western Pennsylvania Hockey League. Four Pittsburgh-area teams competed in the season, in which all games were played at the Duquesne Gardens.

By 1908, the league could no longer rely on salaries as novelty to attract Canadian talent, since professionalism had spread into Canada. Many players were lured to the league since the WPHL played on the Duquesne Gardens' artificial ice and was not dependent on cold weather to provide a naturally frozen surface. However, as winter began and Canadian rinks became available, the players would just return to teams closer to their Canadian homes. This jumping affected all of the league's teams. Once the Pittsburgh Lyceum team folded on December 23, it was decided to discontinue the WPHL after the season. The Duquesne Athletic Club beat the Pittsburgh Bankers in the last game of the season to win the final WPHL championship title.

Final standings

Source: Fitzsimmons, p. 415

* The Lyceum discontinued play on December 23, 1908.

References

 

Western Pennsylvania Hockey League seasons
WPHL